Titanowodginite is a mineral with the chemical formula MnTiTa2O8. Titanowodginite has a Mohs hardness of 5.5 and a vitreous luster. It is an iridescent dark brown to black crystal that commonly forms in a matrix of smoky quartz or white beryl in a complex zoned pegmatite.

It was first described in 1992 for an occurrence in the Tanco Mine located in southern Manitoba, Canada.  It was named because it is a titanium bearing member of the wodginite group.

References 

Oxide minerals
Titanium minerals
Manganese(II) minerals
Tantalum minerals
Monoclinic minerals
Minerals in space group 15
Minerals described in 1992